The Barcelona Metro is a network of rapid transit electrified railway lines that run mostly underground in central Barcelona and into the city's suburbs. It is made up of 12 lines, combining the lines owned by the two companies. Two lines, L9 and L10, are being built at present, with both lines having different sections of each opened between 2009 and 2018. They are due to be fully completed in 2026. Three lines on the network have opened as automatic train operation/driverless vehicle systems since 2009: Line 11, Line 9 and Line 10, in chronological order.

History 
The first rapid transit railway service in Barcelona was founded in 1863 by the private company Ferrocarril de Sarrià a Barcelona ("Railway from Sarrià to Barcelona", after 1916 Sarrià joined the municipality of Barcelona). Later this line evolved in what now is basically the current L6 metro service. This railway system, now part of the Ferrocarrils de la Generalitat de Catalunya company, was later inspired by the London Underground naming style having long names for the lines ("Sarrià line", "Balmes line"...).

Much later, in the 1920s, a second and a third rapid transit railway systems were founded with the construction of the Gran Metro between Lesseps and the Plaça de Catalunya (part of the modern L3) and, two years later, the Metro Transversal (now part of L1). This third one was built between the Plaça de Catalunya and la Bordeta to link the city centre with the Plaça d'Espanya and Montjuïc, the site of the 1929 Barcelona International Exposition. These two later rapid transit companies contrasted with the first one in being inspired by the Métropolitain de Paris (from where the word "metro" comes).

As of 2022, the network consists of 12 lines managed by 2 different operators: Transports Metropolitans de Barcelona (TMB) and Ferrocarrils de la Generalitat de Catalunya (FGC, or Catalan Government Railways). Fares and nomenclature are controlled by the Autoritat del Transport Metropolità, a citywide system that also includes local and regional buses, tramways and some commuter and regional train services.

Network 
Since early 2020, the total length of the network is 166 km and 189 stations, including the TMB+FGC+Montjuïc funicular.

The major network, operated by TMB, consists of eight lines, numbered L1 to L5 and L9 to L11 (which are distinguished on network maps by different colours), covering  of route and 141 stations.

FGC lines are numbered L6, L7, L8 and L12. These lines, except all of L12 and part of L7, share tracks with commuter rail lines.

The Barcelona Metro lines do not have a name of their own but are generally referred to by their colour or by the number and the names of their termini.

Lines 
The lines run as follows:

In addition to those, Renfe and FGC trains and the increasingly important tram routes and stations are displayed on most recent maps, including the info maps in the metro stations, all in a single variety of dark green.

L9 and L10 

Construction work is taking place currently on L9/L10, which will run from Badalona and Santa Coloma de Gramenet to the Zona Franca district and El Prat International Airport. The project was approved in 2000 but has been challenged by some technical difficulties and some of their sections are pending further geological analysis. The first section of Line 9 that runs between La Sagrera and Can Zam opened in 2009, and by June 2010 eleven new stations on the new Lines L9 and L10 had opened.

Rolling stock

Tickets and pricing 
In addition to the one-way ticket there are a number of other tickets and cards. All of the Autoritat del Transport Metropolità (ATM) transport cards are valid and can be used in the Barcelona Metro. These are:
 Airport Ticket, is a one-way ticket for the airport stations, only required if travelling with a special airport ticket
 T casual, which includes ten rides at a discounted price
 T usual, unlimited journeys made in 30 consecutive days from the first use

All of the metro stations are within fare zone 1.

Stations 

At the end of 2018, there are 187 operational stations in the Barcelona Metro, served by the 12 lines in current use. The average distance between 2 stations is 807.50 metres.

An overwhelming majority of stations in the network lack related buildings or structures aboveground, mostly consisting of an access with stairs, escalators or elevators. The official TMB metro indicator, a red rhombus with a M inside, remains unused by FGC lines, which use their company logo and a different rhombus-shaped logo (actually rather similar to the one used inside the Madrid Metro) inside stations. Below ground their decoration is remarkably sober, with the exception of all the new stations.

Disused stations 

A number of stations in the network have been closed, were never inaugurated, or have been moved to a nearby location. See the main article for more details.

Accessibility 
Accessibility for passengers with reduced mobility is nearing completion. , 8 out of 192 stations are not fully accessible.
The non accessible stations are:
 Ciutadella | Vila Olímpica (L4)
 Clot (L1)
 Espanya (L1/L3) - The FGC Plaça Espanya station (L8 and suburban lines) is accessible.
 Maragall (L4/L5)
 Plaça de Sants (L1/L5)
 Urquinaona (L1/L4)
 Verdaguer (L4/L5)
 Virrei Amat (L5)
Lines L2, L6, L7, L8, L9 Nord, L9 Sud, L10 Nord, L10 Sud, L11 and L12 are fully accessible.
Non accessible connections (in both directions):
 Catalunya L1/Rodalies (commuter/regional) to/from L3/FGC (metro L6/L7 and commuter)
 Passeig de Gràcia L2/L4 to/from L3/Rodalies (commuter/regional)
 Clot L1 to L2 in both directions (the Clot L2 station is accessible).
 Ciutadella | Vila Olímpica L4 to/from Trambesòs
For up to date info check the official sites of TMB and FGC

Transportation in the Metropolitan Area of Barcelona 
The Barcelona Metro is part of a larger transportation network, regulated and fare-integrated by Autoritat del Transport Metropolità.

Among these services, there are two large systems which operate both inside and outside the city limits of Barcelona: the commuter train lines operated by Renfe, amalgamated in the Rodalies Barcelona, or Ferrocarrils de la Generalitat de Catalunya lines which start in the metro lines the company operates (L6, L7 and L8) and which become a fully-fledged railway system which serves most of the metropolitan area: list of FGC lines. FGC is developing metros for Sabadell and Terrassa - see Barcelona–Vallès Line.

Network map

See also

Barcelona Metro topics 
 List of Barcelona metro stations
 Disused Barcelona metro stations
 Autoritat del Transport Metropolità
 Spanish solution, also known as Barcelona solution

Rapid transit in Barcelona 
 Transport in Barcelona
 List of railway stations in Barcelona
 Rodalies de Catalunya and FGC-operated Rodalies Barcelona
 List of Rodalies Barcelona railway stations
 FGC suburban lines
 Trambaix and Trambesòs
 Tramvia blau
 List of tram stations in Barcelona
 Funicular de Montjuïc
 Funicular de Vallvidrera

Other metro systems in Spain 
 Metro Bilbao
 Madrid Metro
 Palma de Mallorca Metro
 Seville Metro
 Valencia Metro
 Málaga Metro
 List of metro systems

Notes

References

External links 

 Transports Metropolitans de Barcelona
 Ferrocarrils de la Generalitat de Catalunya
 Barcelona Metro
 CityMayors article on Barcelona Metro
 Unofficial Barcelona rail network map
 Unofficial Barcelona Metro Map
 Wefer.com
 Barcelona metro map for wheelchair users

 
Rail transport in Barcelona
Underground rapid transit in Spain
Rapid transit in Spain
Busking venues
1445 mm gauge railways
Standard gauge railways in Spain